Renzo Minoli (6 May 1904 – 18 April 1965) was an Italian fencer. He won a gold medal in the team épée event at the 1928 Summer Olympics and a silver in the same event at the 1932 Summer Olympics.

References

External links
 

1904 births
1965 deaths
Italian male fencers
Olympic fencers of Italy
Fencers at the 1928 Summer Olympics
Fencers at the 1932 Summer Olympics
Olympic gold medalists for Italy
Olympic silver medalists for Italy
Olympic medalists in fencing
Fencers from Milan
Medalists at the 1928 Summer Olympics
Medalists at the 1932 Summer Olympics